Cape Hillsborough is a coastal locality in the Mackay Region, Queensland, Australia.

Geography
The waters of the Coral Sea surround the locality to the north, east, and south. Cape Hillsborough National Park is within the locality.

References 

Mackay Region
Coastline of Queensland
Localities in Queensland